Wei Ninghui (born September 15, 1993) is a Chinese Muay Thai kickboxer.

He was ranked as a top ten featherweight by Combat Press between March and December of 2017.

Kickboxing career 
At the age of twelve he went to martial arts school, and at the age of fifteen he went to Thailand training in Muay Thai.

On January 25, 2014 at the Pattaya Beach Square in Pattaya, Thailand, in Kunlun Fight 1, Wei beat Suthin Banchamek by TKO.

In November 21, 2015, in Kunlun Fight 34, Wei beat Andrea Serra by TKO.

On April 26, 2016 in Zhoukou Gymnasium in Zhoukou, Wei beat Pascal Koster by decision.

Wei took part in the 2016 Kunlun Fight Welterweight Tournament. He defeated Craig Dickson by a second round KO in the quarter finals. He beat Meng Guodong by a first round lowkick KO in the semifinals. In the finals, Ninghui fought Abdellah Ezbiri, whom he beat by a first round lowkick KO.

Wei fought Jordan Kranio during Kunlun Fight 70. The fight was ruled a draw after three rounds, and went into an extra fourth round. After the extra round was fought, it was once again ruled a draw. Ninghui was scheduled to fight Kenta Yamata in during Kunlun Fight 73. He won the fight by unanimous decision. Ninghui rematched Kranio during Kunlun Fight 76, and won by TKO in the second round.

Ninghui participated in the 2017 KLF 66 kg tournament, and fought Yang Zhuo in the quarterfinals. Wei lost to the eventual tournament winner by majority decision.

Ninghui participated in the 2018 Kunlun Fight 66 kg tournament, and was scheduled to fight Soufiane Kaddouri in the quarterfinals. Kaddouri won the bout by an extra round, unanimous, decision.

He fought Ilias Bulaid during the 2019/20 WLF Group Stage. Bulaid won the fight by KO, after landing a right straight to the body of Ninghui.

He won a decision against Wang Pengfei during WLF New Kings Champions Challenge.

Championships and awards 

 Kickboxing
2016 Kunlun Fight Welterweight Tournament Champion
2013 WMC 63.5 kg World Champion
2012 King's Cup of Muaythai 60 kg Champion

Kickboxing record

|-  style="background:#;"
| 2022-12-31 || ||align=left| Kachoenram Aniwat|| Battle Time Championship  || Kunming, China ||  ||  || 

|-  style="background:#fbb;"
| 2021-11-27 || Loss || align=left| Jia Aoqi || Wu Lin Feng 2021: World Contender League 7th Stage Contender League Semi Final || Zhengzhou, China || Decision || 3 ||3:00

|-  style="background:#fbb;"
| 2021-08-07 || Loss|| align=left| Tie Yinghua|| Wu Lin Feng 2021: WLF in Tangshan  || Tangshan, China || Decision (Unanimous) || 3 ||3:00

|-  style="text-align:center; background:#cfc;"
| 2021-07-03 || Win || align=left| Zhou Jiaqiang || Wu Lin Feng 2021: World Contender League 5th Stage || Zhengzhou, China || Decision (Split) ||  3|| 3:00

|-  style="text-align:center; background:#;"
| 2021-05-29 || || align=left| Liu Yaning || Wu Lin Feng 2021: World Contender League 4th Stage || Zhengzhou, China ||  ||  ||

|-  style="text-align:center; background:#fbb;"
| 2021-01-23 || Loss || align=left| Wang Pengfei || Wu Lin Feng 2021: Global Kung Fu Festival, Quarter Final || Macao, China || Decision (Unanimous) ||3 ||3:00

|-  style="text-align:center; background:#cfc;"
| 2020-10-16 || Win|| align=left| Wang Pengfei|| Wu Lin Feng 2020: China New Kings Champions Challenge match || Hangzhou, China || Decision  || 3 || 3:00

|-  style="text-align:center; background:#FFBBBB;"
| 2019-10-26 || Loss ||align=left| Jia Aoqi || Wu Lin Feng 2019: WLF -67kg World Cup 2019-2020 5th Group Stage || Zhengzhou, China || Decision (Unanimous) || 3 ||

|- align="center"  bgcolor="#CCFFCC"
| 2019-09-13|| Win ||align=left| Izzeddin Nafez || Kunlun Fight 83 || China || Decision || 3 || 3:00

|- align="center"  bgcolor="#CCFFCC"
| 2019-07-27|| Win ||align=left| Htaw Mon || Kunlun Fight 81 || China || Decision (Unanimous) || 3 || 3:00

|-
|- align="center"  bgcolor="#FFBBBB"
| 2019-06-29|| Loss||align=left| Ilias Bulaid|| Wu Lin Feng 2019: WLF -67kg World Cup 2019-2020 1st Group Stage || Zhengzhou, China || KO (Straight Right to the Body) || 3 || 1:11

|- align="center"  bgcolor="#cfc"
| 2019-04-27|| Win||align=left| Will Romero || Wu Lin Feng 2019: WLF -63kg Championship World Tournament || Zhuhai, China || Decision  || 3 || 3:00

|- align="center"  bgcolor="#FFBBBB"
| 2018-12-15 || Loss ||align=left| Soufiane Kaddouri || Kunlun Fight 79 - 66kg World Championship, 1/8 finals || Taiyuan, China || Ex.R Decision (Unanimous) || 4 || 3:00 
|- align="center"  bgcolor="#CCFFCC"
| 2018-09-09 || Win ||align=left| Jordan Kranio || Kunlun Fight 76 || China || TKO (3 Knockdowns/Left Hook to the Body) || 2 || 
|- align="center"  bgcolor="#CCFFCC"
| 2018-05-06 || Win ||align=left| Kenta || Kunlun Fight 73 || China || Decision (Unanimous) || 3 || 3:00
|- align="center"  bgcolor="#c5d2ea"
| 2018-03-11 || Draw||align=left| Jordan Kranio || Kunlun Fight 70 || China || Ext. R Decision (Majority) || 4 || 3:00 
|- align="center"  bgcolor="#CCFFCC"
| 2017-11-29 || Win ||align=left| Meeha || Yingxiong Hui || Macau, China || Decision (Unanimous) || 3 || 3:00
|- align="center"  bgcolor="#FFBBBB"
| 2017-11-12 || Loss ||align=left| Yang Zhuo || Kunlun Fight 67 - 66kg World Championship, Quarter Finals || Sanya, China || Decision (Majority) || 3 || 3:00 
|- align="center"  bgcolor="#CCFFCC"
| 2017-09-30 || Win ||align=left| Kirill Smirnov || Topking & Quansheng || Pingtan, China || Decision (Unanimous) || 3 || 3:00
|- align="center"  bgcolor="#CCFFCC"
| 2017-08-27 || Win || align=left| Jairon Ortega || Kunlun Fight 65 - Kunlun Fight 16 Man Tournament 66 kg-1/8 finals || Qingdao, China || TKO (Right Low Kick) || 2 || 2:33 
|- align="center"  bgcolor="#FFBBBB"
| 2017-06-10 || Loss ||align=left| Kompetch Fairtex|| Kunlun Fight 62 || Bangkok, Thailand || Decision (Majority) || 3 || 3:00
|- align="center"  bgcolor="#CCFFCC"
| 2017-05-14 || Win ||align=left| Hector Santiago|| Kunlun Fight 61 || China || Decision (Unanimous) || 3 || 3:00
|- align="center"  bgcolor="#CCFFCC"
| 2017-02-26 || Win ||align=left| Kompetch Fairtex|| Kunlun Fight 57 || China || Decision (Unanimous) || 3 || 3:00
|- align="center"  bgcolor="#CCFFCC"
| 2017-01-01 || Win ||align=left| Juan Javier Barragan || Kunlun Fight 56 || Sanya, China || KO(Right Hook) || 1 || 2:50
|- align="center"  bgcolor="#FFBBBB"
| 2016-11-17 || Loss ||align=left| Melsik Baghdasaryan || Wu Lin Feng || Las Vegas, USA || Decision (Unanimous) || 3 || 3:00  
|- align="center"  bgcolor="#CCFFCC"
| 2016-09-10 || Win ||align=left| Abdellah Ezbiri || Kunlun Fight 51 - Welterweight Tournament Finals || Fuzhou, China || TKO (Low Kick)  || 1 ||   
|-
! colspan="9" style="background:white" | 
|- align="center"  bgcolor="#CCFFCC"
| 2016-09-10 || Win ||align=left| Meng Guodong  || Kunlun Fight 51 - Welterweight Tournament Semi Finals || Fuzhou, China || TKO (Low Kick)  || 1 ||     
|- align="center"  bgcolor="#CCFFCC"
| 2016-09-10 || Win ||align=left| Craig Dickson || Kunlun Fight 51 - Welterweight Tournament Quarter Finals || Fuzhou, China || KO || 2 ||   
|- align="center"  bgcolor="#CCFFCC"
| 2016-08-07 || Win ||align=left| Yosuke Mizuochi || Kunlun Fight 49 & Rebels 45 - Welterweight Tournament 1/8 Finals || Jinan, China || KO || 2 ||  
|- 
! style=background:white colspan=9 | 
|- align="center"  bgcolor="#CCFFCC"
| 2016-06-26 || Win ||align=left| Son Star || Kunlun Fight 46 || Kunming, China || Decision (Unanimous) || 3 || 3:00  
|- align="center"  bgcolor="#CCFFCC"
| 2016-04-26 || Win ||align=left| Pascal Koster || Kunlun Fight 43 || Zhoukou, China || Decision (Unanimous) || 3 || 3:00  
|- align="center"  bgcolor="#CCFFCC"
| 2016-03-20 || Win ||align=left| Giorgi Khupenia || Kunlun Fight 39 || Dongguan, China || Decision (Unanimous) || 3 || 3:00  
|- align="center"  bgcolor="#CCFFCC"
| 2016-02-20 || Win ||align=left| Ziyoo Kubanov || QUSN || Quanzhou, China || TKO || 3 ||  
|- align="center"  bgcolor="#CCFFCC"
| 2015-12-19 || Win ||align=left| Kim Dongsu || Kunlun Fight 35 || Luoyang, China || Decision (Unanimous) || 3 || 3:00  
|- align="center"  bgcolor="#CCFFCC"
| 2015-11-27 || Win ||align=left| McBride || Topking || Nantong, China || Decision (Unanimous) || 3 || 3:00  
|- align="center"  bgcolor="#CCFFCC"
| 2015-11-21 || Win ||align=left| Andrea Serra || Kunlun Fight 34 || Shenzhen, China || TKO || 3 || 
|- align="center"  bgcolor="#FFBBBB"
| 2015-10-03 || Loss ||align=left| Maksim Petkevich || Wu Lin Feng 2015 WLF World Championship Tournament −63 kg, First Round || Hong Kong, China || Decision (Unanimous) || 3 || 3:00  
|- align="center"  bgcolor="#FFBBBB"
| 2015-07-28 || Loss ||align=left| Rungravee Sasiprapa || Kunlun Fight & Top King World Series 4 || Hong Kong, China || Decision (Unanimous) || 3 || 3:00  
|- align="center"  bgcolor="#CCFFCC"
| 2015-07-18 || Win ||align=left| Keijiro Miyakoshi || Kunlun Fight 27 || Nanjing, China || Decision (Split) || 3 || 3:00  
|- align="center"  bgcolor="#CCFFCC"
| 2015-07-01 || Win ||align=left| Jeferson Oliveira || T-one Muay Thai 2015 || Beijing, China || KO || 1 ||   
|- align="center"  bgcolor="#CCFFCC"
| 2015-06-07 || Win ||align=left| Tomasz Makowski || Kunlun Fight 26 || Chongqing, China || KO || 1 ||   
|- align="center"  bgcolor="#FFBBBB"
| 2015-04-26 || Loss ||align=left| Lerdsila Chumpairtour || Kunlun Fight 23 || Changsha, China || Decision (Unanimous) || 3 || 3:00  
|- align="center"  bgcolor="#CCFFCC"
| 2015-03-17 || Win ||align=left| Denis Puric || Kunlun Fight 21 || Sanya, China || KO || 2 ||   
|- align="center"  bgcolor="#CCFFCC"
| 2015-02-28 || Win ||align=left| Marvin Madariaga || Kunlun Fight vs WCK Muaythai || Los Angeles, USA || Decision (Unanimous) || 3 || 3:00  
|- align="center"  bgcolor="#CCFFCC"
| 2014-12-27 || Win ||align=left| Rungwanchai || I am National Hero || Zhengzhou, China || Decision (Unanimous) || 3 || 3:00 
|- align="center"  bgcolor="#CCFFCC"
| 2014-08-10 || Win ||align=left| Paisley || CFC || Guizhou, China || Decision (Unanimous) || 3 || 3:00 
|- align="center"  bgcolor="#FFBBBB"
| 2014-06-07 || Loss ||align=left| Marvin Madariaga || Kunlun Fight vs WCK Muaythai || Los Angeles, USA || Decision (Unanimous) || 3 || 3:00  
|- align="center"  bgcolor="#FFBBBB"
| 2014-04-27 || Loss ||align=left| Keijiro Miyakoshi || Kunlun Fight 4 || Manila, Philippines || Ext. R Decision (Unanimous) || 4 || 3:00  
|- 
! style=background:white colspan=9 |
|- align="center"  bgcolor="#CCFFCC"
| 2014-01-25 || Win ||align=left| Suthin Banchamek || Kunlun Fight 1 || Pattaya, Thailand || TKO || 2 ||   
|- align="center"  bgcolor="#CCFFCC"
| 2013-09-17 || Win ||align=left| Fong Chuen MING || Combat Renaissance || Hong Kong, China || Decision (Unanimous) || 3 || 3:00  
|- align="center"  bgcolor="#FFBBBB"
| 2013-08-12 || Loss ||align=left| Thodkhui MR.Manas || Emei Wushu Festival || Mountain Emei, China || Decision (Unanimous) || 3 || 3:00  
|- align="center"  bgcolor="#CCFFCC"
| 2012-08-18 || Win ||align=left|  || King's Cup 2012 || Bangkok, Thailand || TKO || 1 ||   
|-
! colspan="9" style="background:white" | 
|-
| colspan=9 | Legend:

See also
List of male kickboxers

References 

Chinese male kickboxers
Featherweight kickboxers
1993 births
Living people
Chinese Muay Thai practitioners
Kunlun Fight kickboxers
People from Zhoukou
Sportspeople from Henan
Kunlun Fight kickboxing champions